Tropicana may refer to:

Companies
Tropicana Entertainment, a former casino company that owned several Tropicana-branded casinos
Tropicana Products, a Chicago-based food company known for orange juice

Hotels and nightclubs
Tropicana Casino & Resort Atlantic City, Atlantic City, New Jersey
Tropicana Club, a nightclub in Havana, Cuba and New York City
Tropicana Evansville, now Bally's Evansville, a casino hotel in Evansville, Indiana
Tropicana Laughlin, a casino hotel in Laughlin, Nevada
Tropicana Las Vegas, a casino hotel on the Las Vegas Strip

Music
"Tropicana", a song by Gruppo Italiano 
"Club Tropicana", a song by Wham! from their album Fantastic

Places
Tropicana, Weston-super-Mare, a now-derelict outdoor swimming pool in Somerset, England
Tropicana Avenue, a street in Las Vegas, Nevada
Tropicana Field, a stadium in St. Petersburg, Florida
Tropicana Gold Mine, a major gold mine in Western Australia
Tropicana LRT station (LRT3), a transit station in Malaysia

Sports
Tropicana 400, a NASCAR race, now known as the Camping World 400
Tropicana Twister 300, a NASCAR race, now known as the Camping World 300